Halam is a village and civil parish in the Newark and Sherwood district of Nottinghamshire, England, with a population of 372 in 2001, increasing to 426 at the 2011 Census. 
It is located to the west of Southwell.

The parish church, which was built in the 11th–12th centuries, is dedicated to St Michael the Archangel.
At the north end of the village is an 18th-century water mill, three storeys with a lean-to wheelhouse and adjoining cottage.
There is a public house called the Waggon & Horses, which is the first carbon-neutral pub in the United Kingdom and home of the Nottinghamshire Pie, a dish created by chef Roy Wood.
The school is called Halam Church of England Primary School.

Halam is the birthplace of travel writer and academic Robert Macfarlane.

References

External links

Villages in Nottinghamshire
Newark and Sherwood